Grigor Yeghiazaryan (8 December 1908 − 4 November 1988) was a Soviet and Armenian composer. People's Artist of the USSR (1977).

He was born on 8 December 1908 in Blur, Erivan Governorate, Russian Empire (now in Enginalan, Iğdır, Turkey). In 1935, Yeghiazaryan graduated from the Moscow State Conservatory with Nikolai Myaskovsky. From 1936 to 1938, he lectured and also was the head of the training section of the Music College in Leninakan. After 1938, he lived in Yerevan, and gave lessons in the music college and the Komitas State Conservatory of Yerevan. He was the head of composition classes and was appointed a professor in 1959.

From 1952 to 1955, he was the chairman of the Armenian Union of Composers. From 1954 to 1960, he was the rector at the Yerevan Komitas State Conservatory. He was the Armenian SSR State Prize winner of 1971. He died on 4 November 1988 in Yerevan, Armenia.

1908 births
1988 deaths
20th-century Armenian musicians
20th-century composers
People from Erivan Governorate
Academic staff of the Komitas State Conservatory of Yerevan
Moscow Conservatory alumni
People's Artists of Armenia
People's Artists of the USSR
Recipients of the Order of the Red Banner of Labour
Armenian composers
Armenian people from the Russian Empire
Soviet Armenians
Armenian ballet composers